State of Emergency is the seventh studio album by reggae band Steel Pulse. It was released in June 1988 via MCA Records. Recording sessions took place in the United Kingdom. Production was handled by Steel Pulse with Godwin Logie. The album debuted at number 177 on the Billboard 200 albums chart in the US.

Track listing

Charts

References

External links

1988 albums
MCA Records albums
Steel Pulse albums